Crambus kazitaellus is a moth in the family Crambidae that is endemic to Kenya. It was described by Graziano Bassi in 1986.

References

Crambini
Moths described in 1986
Moths of Africa